Vuzu was a South African youth-oriented television channel produced by M-Net for sister pay television platform DStv.

History
The channel launched on 1 August 2003 as "go", as a competitor to MTV.

In March 2009, it was announced that the channel would be rebranded as Vuzu on 1 July 2009, tying into an attempted social network of the same name. The network also switched its programming schedule and discontinued some shows, to the complaint of some viewers. In 2014, a companion channel, Vuzu Amp, replaced M-Net Series, which took its current name of 1Magic on 29 January 2018 with a more localized schedule.

Vuzu's schedule changed at the start of September 2018, along with its logo, focusing on more high-profile American sitcoms and dramas, with some local content.

Closure
On 1 October 2021, it was announced that Vuzu will close on 1 November 2021. Its programming moved to the channel space of M-Net City, which likewise took on the new name Me. However the network actually closed two days early, at the end of 29 October 2021.

Logos

Local programs

Hit Refresh
V Entertainment
Vuzic
10 over 10
Dineo's Diary
Fly Chix
Mo Love
Scar Tissue
Top Shayela
I Am
Creative Union
Forever Young
Top Shayela: Reality Check

References

M-Net
Television stations in South Africa
Television channels and stations established in 2003
Television channels and stations established in 2009
Television channels and stations disestablished in 2021
2003 establishments in South Africa
2021 disestablishments in South Africa
Defunct mass media in South Africa